The Caterpillar C175 is a family of diesel internal combustion engines made by Caterpillar. The engine is 5.3 litres per cylinder in displacement. The cylinder size is 6.89 x 8.66 bore/stroke. The engine can produce 1500-4800 horsepower at 1800 RPM. The peak torque occurs at an engine speed of 1500 RPM. The engine weighs over ten tonnes. The Cat C175 is often used in locomotives and passenger-class ships.

Sample Applications 

 EMD F125
 Caterpillar 797F
 Stadler Eurolight (including British Rail Class 68)
 Stadler Euro Dual (e.g. as German "Class 159" for European Loc Pool)

See also 
 SEMT Pielstick PA4 series engine
 MTU V4000 engine
 Cummins QSK95
 Mitsubishi SR2-PTA series engine

References and notes 

Caterpillar Inc.
Diesel locomotive engines